Caitlin McGuinness (born 30 August 2002) is a professional Northern Irish association footballer who plays as a centre forward for Women's Premiership club Sion Swifts and the Northern Ireland women's national team.

In August 2020 Sion Swifts announced the double signing of Caitlin McGuinness and her elder sister Kirsty McGuinness, both from league champions Linfield.

References

2002 births
Living people
Women's association football forwards
Women's association footballers from Northern Ireland
Northern Ireland women's international footballers
Sion Swifts Ladies F.C. players
Women's Premiership (Northern Ireland) players
Linfield Ladies F.C. players
UEFA Women's Euro 2022 players